Hewritt Frederick Dixon, Jr. (January 8, 1940 – November 24, 1992) was an American professional football player who was a running back for seven seasons in the American Football League (AFL) and National Football League (NFL). He played for the AFL's Denver Broncos and Oakland Raiders, and one season for the Raiders in the NFL. He was an AFL All-Star in 1966, 1967, and 1968, and an NFL Pro Bowler in 1970. Dixon was born in LaCrosse, Florida and died in Los Angeles, California on November 24, 1992 of cancer.

See also
List of American Football League players

References

1940 births
1992 deaths
People from Alachua County, Florida
Players of American football from Florida
American football running backs
Denver Broncos players
Oakland Raiders players
American Football League All-Star players
American Conference Pro Bowl players
Florida A&M Rattlers football players